Henry O'Reilly "Harry" Schell (June 29, 1921 – May 13, 1960) was an American Grand Prix motor racing driver. He was the first American driver to start a Formula One Grand Prix.

Early life

Schell was born in Paris, France, the son of expatriate American and sometime auto racer Laury Schell; his mother was the wealthy American heiress Lucy O'Reilly Schell.  O'Reilly was an auto racing enthusiast who had met Laury while visiting France; they soon became familiar names on the rallying scene together.  She became heavily invested in the Delahaye concern, first campaigning sports cars for them and then championing the development of a Delahaye Grand Prix car, which she ran under the Ecurie Bleue banner.  Frenchman René Dreyfus won the 1938 Pau Grand Prix for the team in a shock upset over Mercedes, but the Delahaye project failed to raise the necessary backing and was never developed to its full extent.

Shortly before the outbreak of the Second World War, Schell's parents were involved in a road accident in which Laury was killed and O'Reilly severely injured. When France was occupied by Germany, Schell and his mother returned to America, where Schell took on the running of two Maseratis at the 1940 Indianapolis 500.  Having already volunteered in the Finnish Air Force during their Winter War with Russia in 1939, Harry then earned a commission in the United States Tank Corps when America entered the Second World War.

Racing career

Schell went on to race in Europe, driving Coopers in Formula 3, Formula 2 and even the Formula One World Drivers' Championship upon its inception in 1950.  His first appearance was in a Cooper powered by a J.A.P. V-twin engine at Monte Carlo; it ended in an accident at the harbor chicane that involved the majority of the field.

Though Schell never won a championship Grand Prix and enjoyed life as a playboy and womanizer, he was highly respected in period; he twice stood on the podium with a best place of second in the 1958 Dutch Grand Prix, won the Caen Grand Prix of 1956, and balanced those with periodic sports car outings. He partnered with Stirling Moss in securing a second place at the 1957 12 Hours of Sebring, and took third place at the same event in 1959. His most notable spells in Formula One came for BRM, Vanwall, and the Maserati factory effort as a subordinate to the five-time champion Juan Manuel Fangio. He also drove for Scuderia Ferrari for a single run at the 1955 Monaco Grand Prix.

Schell carved out a reputation as a safe and prudent competitor and could be counted on as a consistent points scorer, but he also proved his class when the opportunity presented itself. In the 1954 Spanish Grand Prix, he took the lead from the start in his private Maserati and drove off into the distance before spinning out of first place and then retiring with a transmission failure.  At the 1956 French Grand Prix, he relieved an ill Mike Hawthorn after his own Vanwall had gone out with an early engine failure and drove back into second position.  The Ferrari team, operating under the assumption that Schell was a lap adrift, had been caught out, and a dramatic fight for the lead ensued, but Schell's effort went for nought as he was forced to make a lengthy pit stop soon after.  He had succeeded, however, in displaying the full potential of the Vanwall on the world stage for the first time. Driving a Ferrari 375 Indy for Luigi Chinetti's North American Racing Team at the 1958 Race of Two Worlds, Schell joined Phil Hill (Scuderia Ferrari 296 Dino) and Masten Gregory (Ecurie Ecosse Jaguar D-Type) on the Monza high banking as the only American drivers not entered in an American Championship Car.

By the start of 1960, and nearing 40, Schell's prospects appeared dim, and he campaigned a private Cooper run under his family's Ecurie Bleue banner.  That changed, however, when he was contracted by the British Racing Partnership team before the start of the European Grand Prix season for a full program of events, to be teamed with Tony Brooks and the up-and-coming Chris Bristow in year-old Coopers.  Schell died in practice for the non-championship International Trophy event at Silverstone in 1960, when he crashed his Cooper at Abbey Curve. Schell was driving at approximately 100 mph when his car slid into the mud on the side of the track and lost a wheel. The Cooper somersaulted and penetrated a safety barrier, causing a brick wall to collapse.

Prior to his death, Schell had been extremely vocal in the promotion of the roll-bar on European racing cars, a safety feature required in America.  By the 1500cc formula of 1961, it had become standard in Formula One.

Racing record

Post WWII Grandes Épreuves results
(key)

Complete Formula One World Championship results
(key)

* Shared drive/s.

Formula One Non-Championship results
(key) (Races in bold indicate pole position; races in italics indicate fastest lap)

Complete 24 Hours of Le Mans results

References

External links
Harry Schell profile at The 500 Owners Association

1921 births
1960 deaths
Grand Prix drivers
American racing drivers
American Formula One drivers
Enrico Platé Formula One drivers
Gordini Formula One drivers
Maserati Formula One drivers
Ferrari Formula One drivers
Vanwall Formula One drivers
Ecurie Bonnier Formula One drivers
BRM Formula One drivers
Racing drivers who died while racing
Racing drivers from Paris
Sport deaths in England
24 Hours of Le Mans drivers
World Sportscar Championship drivers
American expatriates in France
Volunteers in the Winter War
United States Army personnel of World War II
United States Army officers
American expatriates in Finland